In enzymology, an indolelactate dehydrogenase is an enzyme that catalyzes the chemical reaction

(indol-3-yl)lactate + NAD+  (indol-3-yl)pyruvate + NADH + H+

Thus, the two substrates of this enzyme are (indol-3-yl)lactate and NAD+, whereas its 3 products are (indol-3-yl)pyruvate, NADH, and H+.

This enzyme belongs to the family of oxidoreductases, specifically those acting on the CH-OH group of donor with NAD+ or NADP+ as acceptor. The systematic name of this enzyme class is (indol-3-yl)lactate:NAD+ oxidoreductase. This enzyme is also called indolelactate:NAD+ oxidoreductase. This enzyme participates in tryptophan metabolism.

References

 

EC 1.1.1
NADH-dependent enzymes
Enzymes of unknown structure